Claire E. Wainwright   is a paediatric respiratory physician and professor of pediatrics, residing and working in Queensland. She commenced her medical training in London and completed her specialist training at the Royal Children's Hospital, Brisbane. She is now head of the Cystic Fibrosis Service at the Queensland Children's Hospital and a professor of pediatric medicine at the University of Queensland, Australia. Wainwright has published numerous academic papers focusing upon her main area of interest; the impacts of fungal infections upon children with cystic fibrosis. However, her interests also expand to include other airway complications within children.

Personal life
Claire Wainwright is of European descent, she is half French and half Welsh. She grew up in the Middle East, but then attended medical school in London. After marrying Australian Professor Brandon Wainwright, she moved to Queensland where she completed her medical training.

Career
Wainwright decided to pursue research medicine after doing a research elective with the paediatric renal team at Guys Hospital London. Since then she has collaborated on 43 academic articles investigating cystic fibrosis and other respiratory issues in children. She is currently employed by the Queensland Children's Hospital and the University of Queensland as a professor of Paediatrics and Child Health.

In 2016 Wainwright was elected Fellow of the Australian Academy of Health and Medical Sciences.

Publications by Wainwright

References

Australian women scientists
Australian paediatricians
Women pediatricians
Australian people of French descent
Australian people of Welsh descent
Living people
Year of birth missing (living people)
Members of the Order of Australia
Fellows of the Australian Academy of Health and Medical Sciences